Devilman is a Japanese manga series.

Devilman or Devil Man may also refer to:
Devilman (film), a 2004 film based on the manga series
Akira Fudo, the protagonist of the manga series
Devilman or Akkuman, a character in Dragon Ball media
"Super-Charger Heaven", a 1995 song by White Zombie sometimes referred to as "Devil Man" due to its chorus

See also
Devil Lady, a Japanese psychological horror manga series
Amon: The Darkside of the Devilman, a Japanese action and horror manga series
The Devil's Man, a 1967 Italian science fiction film